KNET-CD, virtual channel 25 (UHF digital channel 32), is a Multicultural Independent Class A television station licensed to Los Angeles, California, United States. The station is owned by Sovryn Holdings. Its transmitter is located atop Mt. Wilson. 

In March 2012, previous owner Venture Technologies Group filed to sell the then-KNET-CA and sister station KNLA-LP to Local Media TV Holdings, who subsequently in July 2013 sold the stations to NRJ TV LLC. In July 2021 they were sold to Sovryn Holdings, Inc.

Digital channels
The station's digital signal is multiplexed:

References

External links 

EMT Media: Homepage  

EMT Media: Facebook page  

Television stations in Los Angeles
Television channels and stations established in 1993
Vietnamese-language television stations in California